Yanqaq (also Romanized as Yanqāq; also known as Banqāq) is a village in Yanqaq Rural District in the Central District of Galikash County, Golestan Province, Iran. At the 2006 census, its population was 4,600, in 1,013 families.

References 

Populated places in Galikash County